Fairland may refer to:

Fairland, Illinois, United States
Fairland, Indiana, United States
Fairland, Maryland, United States
Fairland, Oklahoma, United States
Fairland, Roanoke, Virginia, United States
Fairland, Gauteng, a suburb of Johannesburg, South Africa
Fairland (ship), a Sitmar Cruises vessel

People with the surname
Thomas Fairland (1804–1852), English lithographer, engraver and portrait painter

Schools 
Fairland High School (Proctorville, Ohio)
Fairland Local School District in Ohio
Fairlands Middle School in Cheddar, Somerset

See also
Fairlands, Surrey, England